The men's 4 x 100 metre freestyle relay competition of the swimming events at the 2015 Southeast Asian Games was held on 9 June at the OCBC Aquatic Centre in Singapore.

Schedule
All times are Singapore Standard Time (UTC+08:00)

Records 

The following records were established during the competition:

Results

Final

The final was held on 9 June.

References

External links
 

Men's 4 x 100 metre freestyle relay